Davy Mickers (born 4 September 1980 in Gemert, Netherlands) was the drummer of progressive metal band Stream of Passion.
He also played on the special edition bonus-disc of Ayreon's debut album, The Final Experiment.

External links
 Official site

1980 births
Living people
Dutch heavy metal drummers
Male drummers
People from Gemert-Bakel
Stream of Passion members
21st-century drummers
21st-century male musicians